Petter Bjørheim (born 2 January 1965 in Stavanger) is a Norwegian politician for the Progress Party.

He was elected to the Norwegian Parliament from Rogaland in 1989, but was not re-elected in 1993.

External links

1965 births
Living people
Progress Party (Norway) politicians
Members of the Storting
20th-century Norwegian politicians
Politicians from Stavanger